A financial adviser or financial advisor is a professional who provides financial services to clients based on their financial situation. In many countries, financial advisors must complete specific training and be registered with a regulatory body in order to provide advice.

In the United States, a financial adviser carries a Series 7 and Series 66 or Series 65 qualification examination. According to the U.S. Financial Industry Regulatory Authority (FINRA), qualification designations and compliance issues must be reported for public view. Details of formal compliance issues can be found on the Investment Adviser Public Disclosure (IAPD) website and details of non-formal issues can be found on Onesta. FINRA specifies the following groups who may use the term financial advisor: brokers, investment advisers, private bankers, accountants, lawyers, insurance agents and financial planners. Financial advisors need to be able to take the full picture of the client's financial situation into account.

Role
Financial advisers typically provide financial products and services, depending on the qualification examinations they hold and the training they have. Financial advisers are registered, not licensed. For example, a licensed insurance agent may be qualified to sell both life insurance and variable annuities, because the insurance agent holds an insurance license and holds the Series 7 qualification examination. A broker (Series 7) may also be a financial planner. Any advisor can say they are a financial planner; they do not have to hold the CFP (Certified Financial Planner) designation to do so. A financial adviser may create financial plans for clients or sell financial products, or a combination of both. They may also provide insight on savings.

Compensation
A financial adviser is generally compensated through fees, commissions, or a combination of both. For example, a financial adviser may be compensated in one or more of the following ways:
 An hourly fee for advisory services
 A flat fee, such as $3,500 per year, for an annual portfolio review or $5,000 for a financial plan. This is often referred to as "flat fee advisors"
 A commission on the securities bought or sold, such as $12 per trade
 A commission (sometimes called a "load") based on the amount invested in a mutual fund or variable annuity
 A "mark-up": when one buys "house" products (such as bonds that the broker holds in inventory), or a "mark-down" when they are sold
 A fee for assets under management (AUM), such as 1% annually of assets managed

Advisor vs. adviser

Both spellings, advisor and adviser, are accepted and denote someone who provides advice. According to one textbook, adviser and advisor are not interchangeable in the financial services industry, since the term adviser is generally used "when referring to legislative acts and their requirements and advisor when referring to a practitioner. Since [a financial advisor's practice] is never described as an advisery practice, advisor is preferable when not referencing the law." Congress and the Securities Exchange Commission refer to "investment advisers" when discussing regulation of them in the Investment Advisers Act of 1940.

Regulation

United States
Advisors typically fall into two separate categories: broker-dealers (BD) who typically earn a commission from sales and registered investment advisers (RIAs) who typically charge a fee based upon assets under management while serving as fiduciaries and are registered at the state or federal level. Additionally, an advisor can be either affiliated with a large firm ("wirehouse") or be independent (e.g., independent broker-dealer or IBD). There are also "hybrid RIAs" who are both broker-dealers and registered.

The number of independent broker-dealer firms has declined from 1175 in 2007 to 819 in 2018, while RIA firms have grown from 9,538 to 15,645 over the same time period. As of 2016, the largest IBD firm by revenue was LPL Financial followed by Ameriprise Financial and Raymond James Financial. Edward Jones is another large broker-dealer, and in 2017 stopped selling commission-based funds in response to a best interest fiduciary rule by the Department of Labor (DOL). As of 2019, Merrill Lynch had not adopted an RIA model while Wells Fargo and Goldman Sachs had opened up to the business model. As of 2019, the largest fee-only RIA firm was Edelman Financial Engines with over $200 billion in assets under management, under the ownership of private equity firm Hellman & Friedman. Other large fee-only RIA firms include Fisher Investments, which has over $120 billion in assets under management. As of 2019, 80% of the $4 trillion managed by RIAs were on one of four platforms: Fidelity Investments, Schwab, and Pershing LLC. Some RIAs operate inside "RIA aggregators" which provide institutional support similar to a wirehouse.

In the United States, the Financial Industry Regulatory Authority (FINRA) regulates and oversees the activities of brokerage firms, and their registered representatives. The Securities and Exchange Commission (SEC) regulates investment advisers and their investment adviser representatives. Insurance companies, insurance agencies and insurance producers are regulated by state authorities. Investment Advisers may be registered with state regulatory agencies, the Securities and Exchange Commission, or pursuant to certain exemptions, remain unregistered.

Fiduciary standard
The anti-fraud provisions of the Investment Advisers Act of 1940 and most state laws impose a duty on Investment Advisors to act as fiduciaries in dealings with their clients. This means the adviser must hold the client's interest above its own in all matters. The SEC has said that an adviser has a duty to:

Make reasonable investment recommendations independent of outside influences
Select broker-dealers based on their ability to provide the best execution of trades for accounts where the adviser has authority to select the broker-dealer.
Make recommendations based on a reasonable inquiry into a client's investment objectives, financial situation, and other factors
Always place client interests ahead of its own.

Since the financial crisis in 2008, there has been great debate regarding the fiduciary standard and to which advisers it should apply. In July 2010, The Dodd–Frank Wall Street Reform and Consumer Protection Act mandated increased consumer protection measures, including enhanced disclosures and authorized the SEC to extend the fiduciary duty to include brokers rather than only advisers regulated by the 1940 Act. As of July 2016, the SEC has yet to extend the fiduciary duty to all brokers and advisers regardless of their designation. However, in April 2016, the Department of Labor finalized a thousand-page rule holding all brokers, including independent brokers, working with retirement accounts (IRAs, 401(k)s, etc.) to the fiduciary standard.

In June 2016, as a way to address adviser conflicts of interest, the DOL ruled in a redefinition of what constitutes financial advice, and who is considered a fiduciary. Prior to 2016, fiduciary standards only applied to Registered Investment Advisers (RIAs), and did not impact brokers, who previously operated under a less strict "suitability" standard that provided leeway to provide education without "advice". The new ruling requires all financial advisers who offer advice for compensation to act as fiduciaries and meet the fiduciary standard, but only when dealing with retirement accounts such as IRA or 401(k) accounts. The ruling includes one exemption for brokers, Best Interest Contract Exemption, which can be allowed if the broker enters into a contract with the plan participant and meets certain behavioral requirements. The new ruling does not impact the advice or investment product sales pertaining to non-retirement accounts.

Opposition to the fiduciary standard maintains that the higher standard of fiduciary duty, vs the lower standard of suitability, would be too costly to implement and reduce choice for consumers. Other criticisms suggest that consumers with smaller retirement accounts may be less able to access personalized advice due to advisor/broker compensation models, many of which have been restructured to comply with the fiduciary rule.

The decision has caused a massive shift in the financial community. One survey found that 73% of advisors were concerned the rule would have an adverse impact on how they do business, 71% anticipated increased client frustration, and 66% planned to reevaluate the products they recommend.

Enforcement of the rule began on 9 June 2017 but is no longer enforced since the DOL fiduciary rule was officially vacated on 21 June 2018 by the U.S. Fifth Circuit Court of Appeals. On 5 June 2019, the SEC adopted Regulation Best Interest, establishing a new standard of conduct under the Securities Exchange Act of 1934 (“Exchange Act”) for broker-dealers, with compliance due to begin 30 June 2020.

In July 2020, the DOL proposed a new fiduciary rule, and made two changes to guidance and regulation.

Registration
A Registered Investment Adviser (RIA) refers to an IA that is registered with the SEC or a state's securities agency and typically provides investment advice to a retail investor or registered investment company such as a mutual fund, or exchange-traded fund. Registered Investment Advisors are regulated by either the SEC or by the individual states, depending on the amount of assets under management.

Canada
The financial adviser role in Canada is varied. Most financial advisers carry licenses to sell life insurance, securities, or mutual funds, or some combination of all three. The life insurance license is obtained through successful completion of the life license qualification program, except in Quebec, where licensing is completed through the Autorité des marchés financiers. There are three distinct securities licenses available. Completion of the Canadian Securities Course (CSC) allows the sale of most types of securities, including stocks, bonds, and mutual funds. More advanced licensing is required for the sale of derivatives and commodities. Completion of a mutual funds course allows the adviser to sell mutual funds only, excluding certain types of very specialized funds and importantly, exchange-traded funds (ETFs)—although recently non-securities licensed financial advisers have gained access to ETFs through new mutual fund products. The third possible license is the exempt securities license.

In many, but not all, cases, licensing requires the support of a dealer or insurer. It is also mandatory for advisers to carry errors and omissions insurance. The term financial adviser can refer to the entire spectrum of advisers. In general, the industry in Canada is segmented into three channels of advisers: MGA, MFDA and IIROC. However, there is little regulatory control exercised over use of the term, and, as such, many insurance brokers, insurance agents, securities brokers, financial planners and others identify themselves as financial advisers.

Many financial advisers in Canada are also financial planners. While there are numerous financial planning designations, the most common is the Certified Financial Planner designation although the Registered Financial Planner (R.F.P.) and Personal Financial Planner designations are also popular in Canada. There is no regulation, outside of Quebec, of the term "Financial Planner".

United Kingdom

There are three main bodies awarding qualifications for financial advisers in the UK. The main one is the Chartered Insurance Institute, which offers professional financial services qualifications all the way from beginner to degree levels. The IFS School of Finance offers alternative courses/qualifications in certain specialist areas such as mortgages and equity release. The Institute of Financial Planning offers the Certified Financial Planner.

In the United Kingdom, investment advice is given either by a financial adviser or a stockbroker.

Financial advisers need to pass a series of exams and receive a Diploma in Financial Planning (or, prior to the Retail Distribution Review, a Financial Planning Certificate) and also authorised by the Financial Conduct Authority, a UK government qango that must be satisfied that the adviser is a “fit and proper person” before they may practice. Typically a diploma qualified adviser will have DipFA or DipPFS after their name.

Financial advisers are either restricted or independent. An independent financial adviser is free to select a suitable solution for the client from all the products and providers in the market. An adviser that is not free to select from the entire market, for whatever reason, is restricted. An adviser may be restricted because they only advise on a specific area, for example pensions, or because they only advise on products from one company such as a bank.

Best advice is a concept that was never more than a heading in the FSA/PIA/NASDIM regulations (and is now withdrawn in favour of the 'appropriate' standard) and which refers to the general obligation under Contract Law (Agency) that a broker has to find the correct 'financial product' to match a client 'need'. A provider firm must not make a recommendation unless it has a suitable product to offer. If it offers no suitable products then none should be recommended. A multi-tied firm must not make any recommendations unless it has access to a suitable product from the providers on their panel. In the UK many believe impartial advice can be obtained only by consulting an independent financial adviser.

Republic of Ireland 

The QFA ("qualified financial advisor") designation is awarded to those who pass the Professional Diploma in Financial Advice and agree to comply with the ongoing "continuous professional development" (CPD) requirements. It is the recognised benchmark designation for financial advisers working in retail financial services. The qualification, and attaching CPD programme, meets the "minimum competency requirements" (MCR) specified by the Financial Regulator, for advising on and selling five categories of retail financial products:
 Savings, investments and pensions
 Housing loans and associated insurances
 Consumer credit and associated insurances
 Shares, bonds and other investment instruments
 Life assurance protection policies

New Zealand
The National Certificate in Financial Services [Financial Advice] [Level 5] is currently being introduced in New Zealand. All Individuates and registered legal entities providing financial services must be registered as a (Registered Financial Service Provider). Their Directors, retail and sales staff are required to gain the national certificate.

The New Zealand Qualifications Authority (NZQA) in conjunction with industry groups via the ETITO administers a qualifications frame work for the qualification. Registrations and examinations are conducted by the ETITO. All financial advisers are required to register with the ETITO by March 31, 2011.

The Qualifications Framework consists of a core set of competencies sets, A B C followed by 2 electives covering specialist areas such as Insurance and Residential Property Lending. Certain NZQA approved qualifications such as an Accountancy degree may exempt students from competency set A NZQA approved training. The certificate is offered by the accredited organizations.

South Korea
In South Korea, the Korea Financial Investment Association oversees the licensing of investment advisers.

Australia
Financial advisors in Australia must have passed a RG146 qualifying and hold a license that is overseen by the Australian Securities and Investments Commission. It ought to be noted that financial advisers in Australia will need to undergo transitional arrangements as new educational requirements will be in place on 1 January 2019. Additionally, financial advisers in Australia are subject to fiduciary obligations.

India 
The Securities and Exchange Board of India (SEBI) is the regulator for the securities market in India.

It was established in 1988 and given statutory powers on 12 April 1992 through the SEBI Act, 1992.
In India, SEBI registered investment advisor is referred, when an investor who would like advice on where to invest in share market or an investor. SEBI has put certain guidelines before giving RIA license to any individual, corporate or firms. In India, there are 1160 RIAs as of 31 January 2020, who are registered with SEBI as registered investment advisor (2013) regulations.

See also
 Collective investment schemes
 Socially responsible investing
 Robo-advisor

References

External links

 AIFA Association of Independent Financial Advisers - UK Trade body
 FCA website Financial Conduct Authority (UK)
 NAIFA National Association of Insurance & Financial Advisors
 SEC IA Search SEC Database of US Registered Investment Advisers
 EFPA Europe European Financial Planning Association

Financial services occupations
Financial advisors
Economics consulting